Akim Mikhailovich Tamiroff (born Hovakim Tamiryants; October 29, 1899 – September 17, 1972) was an Armenian-American actor of film, stage, and television. One of the premier character actors of Hollywood's Golden Age, Tamiroff appeared in at least 80 motion pictures in a career spanning 37 years, developing a prolific career despite his thick accent.

He was nominated twice for the Academy Award for Best Supporting Actor for his performances in The General Died at Dawn (1936) and For Whom the Bell Tolls (1943), and the latter won him the first Golden Globe Award for Best Supporting Actor. Orson Welles, a personal friend and oft-collaborator, praised him as "the greatest of all screen actors."

Early life and education
Tamiroff was born Hovakim Tamiryants to Armenian parents living in the Russian Empire. Different sources cite either Tiflis (in modern-day Georgia) or Baku (in modern-day Azerbaijan) as places of birth. His father was an oil worker, and his mother a seamstress. He trained at the Moscow Art Theatre drama school for nine years from the age of 19, where he was a pupil of Konstantin Stanislavski. During that time, he changed his name to the russified moniker Akim Mikhailovich Tamiroff.

Stage acting
During his time at the Theatre, he became acquainted with fellow Armenian Nikita Balieff. Following the Russian Revolution, Tamiroff and several other émigrés joined Balieff in Paris to form the La Chauve-Souris touring revue.

He arrived in the U.S. for the first time, in January 1923 on a three-month tour with the revue, and starred in a repertory of Russian plays directed by Stanislavski. He returned in November and stayed until 1924. His final trip with them was in October 1927 when he decided to stay permanently. He joined the Theatre Guild in New York City, where he met his wife Tamara Shayne. Both were later naturalized as United States citizens.

Film and television career 

Tamiroff's film debut came in 1932 in an uncredited role in Okay, America!. He performed in several more uncredited roles until 1935, when he appeared in The Lives of a Bengal Lancer. He also appeared in the lavish epic China Seas in 1935 with Clark Gable, Wallace Beery, Jean Harlow, Rosalind Russell and Robert Benchley. The following year, he was cast in the titular role in The General Died at Dawn. He appeared in the 1937 musical High, Wide, and Handsome with Irene Dunne and Randolph Scott, and the 1938 proto-noir Dangerous to Know opposite Anna May Wong, frequently singled out as his best role.

In the following decade, he appeared in such films as The Buccaneer (1938) with Fredric March, The Great McGinty (1940), The Corsican Brothers (1941), Tortilla Flat (1942) with Spencer Tracy, Hedy Lamarr and John Garfield, Five Graves to Cairo (1943) with Erich von Stroheim as Field Marshal Erwin Rommel, Frank Borzage's His Butler's Sister (1943), For Whom the Bell Tolls (1943) with Gary Cooper and Ingrid Bergman, for which he received another Oscar nomination, and Preston Sturges' The Miracle of Morgan's Creek (1944). Though ethnically Armenian, his many character roles have included a range of ethnicities, including Russian, Mexican, Chinese, Italian, French, German, Greek, Egyptian, Polish, Turkish, Malayan, a Tartar chieftain, a Gypsy, and a Jew  

In later years, Tamiroff appeared in Ocean's 11 (1960) with Frank Sinatra and Dean Martin's Rat Pack, Topkapi (1964) with Peter Ustinov and Melina Mercouri, Alphaville (1965), and had a long collaboration with Orson Welles including Touch of Evil (1958) with Charlton Heston, Mr Arkadin (1955), The Trial (1962) and Welles's unfinished version of Don Quixote, in which he played Sancho Panza.

Awards 
In 1944, Tamiroff was the first Golden Globe Award winner for Best Supporting Actor in a Motion Picture for his work in For Whom the Bell Tolls.

He was twice nominated for Academy Awards, both times for Best Actor in a Supporting Role. The first was for his work in The General Died at Dawn, and the second was for his work in For Whom the Bell Tolls.

For his contributions to the American film industry, Tamiroff received a star on the Hollywood Walk of Fame for motion pictures at 1634 Vine Street.

Personal life
Tamiroff's accepted birth year was 1899, although in at least two instances this appeared to be different. In his second trip to America in November 1923 his age is given as 27 and in the 1930 census as 32. He married fellow actress Tamara Shayne, with whom he performed nightclub acts, in February 1933 in Los Angeles. Yet, according to the above-mentioned 1930 census, the couple was living in Chicago, Illinois as married under the (misspelled) name Tameriroff. It appears also that this was his second marriage.

Tamiroff was fluent in five languages - Armenian, Russian, English, French, and Italian.

Death
Tamiroff died on September 17, 1972, from cancer.

Legacy
While Tamiroff may not be a household name now, his malapropistic performance as the boss in The Great McGinty is thought to have been the inspiration for the cartoon character Boris Badenov, the male half of the villainous husband-and-wife team Boris and Natasha on The Rocky and Bullwinkle Show. He was also spoofed in a 1969 episode of the TV show H.R. Pufnstuf entitled "The Stand-in" in which a frog named "Akim Toadanoff" directs a movie on Living Island. He was mentioned in J.D. Salinger's "Uncle Wiggily in Connecticut" (1942 New Yorker), and Walker Percy's 1961 novel The Moviegoer.

Filmography

Film

Television

References

Notes

External links
 
 
 
 
 
 Akim Tamiroff at WFMU
 Akim Tamiroff at Katz's Film Encyclopedia
 Akim Tamiroff at Great Character Actors

1899 births
1972 deaths
20th-century American male actors
20th-century Armenian male actors
Actors from Baku
Actors from Tbilisi
American male film actors
American male stage actors
American people of Armenian descent
Armenian male actors
Armenian people from the Russian Empire
Best Supporting Actor Golden Globe (film) winners
Deaths from cancer in California
Russian people of Armenian descent
Soviet emigrants to the United States
White Russian emigrants to France
Moscow Art Theatre School alumni
Method actors